The list of ship commissionings in 1899 includes a chronological list of all ships commissioned in 1899.


See also 

1899
 Ship commissionings